USS Pecos may refer to the following ships of the United States Navy:

 , a Kanawha-class fleet replenishment oiler, 1920–1942
 , a Suamico-class fleet replenishment oiler, 1942–1946; with Military Sea Transportation Service, from 1950; struck 1974
 , a U.S. Navy Henry J. Kaiser-class fleet replenishment oiler in service since 1989.

United States Navy ship names